Weinert is a city in Haskell County, Texas, United States. The population was 172 at the 2010 census.

Geography

Weinert is located in northeastern Haskell County at  (33.3233, –99.6733). U.S. Route 277 runs through the west side of the city, leading north  to Munday and south  to Haskell, the county seat.

Climate

The climate in this area is characterized by hot, humid summers and generally mild to cool winters.  According to the Köppen climate classification system, Weinert has a humid subtropical climate, Cfa on climate maps.

History
Weinert is named for Senator Ferdinand C. Weinert of Seguin. It was founded upon the 1906 construction of the Wichita Valley Railroad. The community experienced a major storm in 1909. A 1910 fire destroyed businesses for about a city block. The town's population exceeded 500 by 1940.

Demographics

As of the census of 2000, 177 people, 78 households, and 56 families resided in the city. The population density was 366.6 people per square mile (142.4/km). The 101 housing units averaged 209/sq mi (81.2/km). The racial makeup of the city was 82.5% White, 16.4% from other races, and 1.1% from two or more races. Hispanics or Latinos of any race were 19.2% of the population.

Of the 78 households, 28% had children under the age of 18 living with them, 59.0% were married couples living together, 10.3% had a female householder with no husband present, and 28.2% were not families. About 28% of all households were made up of individuals, and 17% had someone living alone who was 65 years of age or older. The average household size was 2.3 and the average family size was 2.7.

In the city, the population was distributed as 20.9% under the age of 18, 5.1% from 18 to 24, 22.6% from 25 to 44, 23.7% from 45 to 64, and 27.7% who were 65 years of age or older. The median age was 46 years. For every 100 females, there were 115.9 males. For every 100 females age 18 and over, there were 109.0 males.

The median income for a household in the city was $22,344, and for a family was $25,000. Males had a median income of $36,250 versus $18,750 for females. The per capita income for the city was $20,257. About 20.0% of families and 19.0% of the population were below the poverty line, including 28.6% of those under the age of 18 and 7.0% of those 65 or over.

Education
The City of Weinert is served by the Haskell Consolidated Independent School District.

On July 1, 1990, Weinert Independent School District merged into Haskell ISD.

References

Cities in Haskell County, Texas
Cities in Texas